Ciudadela, Spanish for "citadel", may refer to:

Ciudadela, Buenos Aires, city in Greater Buenos Aires, Buenos Aires Province, Argentina
Ciudadela, Montevideo, historic monument in Montevideo, Uruguay
 Ciudadela, the Spanish (Castilian) name of Ciutadella de Menorca (Catalan)